Menshov (also transliterated Menchov or Menishov) is a Russian masculine surname originating from the word menshoi, referring to the youngest son in a family; its feminine counterpart is Menshova. Notable people with the name include:
 Denis Menchov (born 1978), Russian road bicycle racer
 Dmitrii Menshov (1892–1988), Russian mathematician
 Evgueny Menishov (1947–2015), Russian actor
 Konstantin Menshov (born 1983), Russian figure skater
 Tatyana Menshova (born 1970), Russian volleyball player
 Vladimir Menshov (1939–2021), Russian actor and film director
 Yuliya Menshova (born 1969), Russian actress

References

Russian-language surnames